Canal Capital is a Colombian local public television channel, launched 3 November 1997, operated as an industrial and commercial company, property of the government of Bogotá. Its programming is general, though focused on political, cultural, and educational programmes.

References

External links 
 

Television stations in Colombia
Spanish-language television stations
Television channels and stations established in 1995
Mass media in Bogotá
Television networks in Colombia